German submarine U-1008 was a Type VIIC/41 U-boat of Nazi Germany's Kriegsmarine during World War II.

She was ordered on 23 March 1942, and was laid down on 12 February 1943, at Blohm & Voss, Hamburg, as yard number 208. She was launched on 8 December 1943, and commissioned under the command of Oberleutnant zur See Diether Todenhagen on 1 February 1944.

Design
German Type VIIC/41 submarines were preceded by the heavier Type VIIC submarines. U-1008 had a displacement of  when at the surface and  while submerged. She had two shafts and two  propellers.

U-1008 was fitted with five  torpedo tubes (four fitted at the bow and one at the stern), fourteen torpedoes or 26 TMA or TMB Naval mines, one  SK C/35 naval gun, (220 rounds), one  Flak M42 and two  C/30 anti-aircraft guns. The boat had a complement of between forty-four and fifty-two.

Service history
U-1008 did not participate in any war patrols.

On 5 May 1945, U-1008 was in the Kattegat, when she was attacked with depth charges by a British B-24 Liberator of the 224th/T piloted by F/Lt F.S. Murphy, W/Cdr M.A. Ensor. The B-24 was given credit for sinking  but the attack only resulted in minor damage to U-1008.

See also
 Battle of the Atlantic

References

Bibliography

External links

German Type VIIC/41 submarines
U-boats commissioned in 1944
World War II submarines of Germany
1944 ships
Ships built in Hamburg
Operation Regenbogen (U-boat)
Maritime incidents in May 1945
U-boats scuttled in 1945